A whirlpool is a swirling body of water.

Whirlpool may also refer to:

General
The whirlpool bath, an alternate name for a hot tub
Whirlpool tub, a bathtub
Whirlpool Corporation, a household appliance manufacturer
Whirlpool (hash function), a cryptographic hash function
Whirlpool Galaxy, aka M51, located in the constellation Canes Venatici
Whirlpool (website), an Australian website for broadband users
The Whirlpool, also known as Niagara Whirlpool, a giant whirlpool on the Canadian side of the Niagara River

Novels
 The Whirlpool (Jane Urquhart novel), a 1986 novel by Jane Urquhart
 The Whirlpool (George Gissing novel), an 1897 novel by George Gissing

Films
Whirlpool (1934 film), a 1934 American drama film directed by Roy William Neill
Whirlpool (1949 film), a 1949 American film directed by Otto Preminger
Whirlpool (1959 film), a 1959 film directed by Lewis Allen, starring O. W. Fischer and Juliette Gréco
Whirlpool (1970 film), a 1970 thriller film directed by José Ramón Larraz
The Whirlpool (1918 film), a 1918 American crime drama film directed by Alan Crosland
The Whirlpool (2012 film), a 2012 American French language romantic drama film directed by Alvin Case
The Whirlpool (1927 film), a 1927 Soviet silent film

Music
Krútňava or The Whirlpool, a 1949 opera by Eugen Suchoň
Whirlpool, a Buckethead album
Whirlpool (Chapterhouse album)
Whirlpool (Some Velvet Sidewalk album)
"Whirlpool" (song), a 1991 song by the Meat Puppets
Whirlpool, a 1990s British band signed to Creation Records and featuring Gem Archer

Places